Los Bellosos is a town in the Puerto Plata province of the Dominican Republic.  The town is 113 miles (182 kilometers) north-west of the country's capital Santo Domingo.

Sources 
http://nona.net/features/map/placedetail.1530656/Los%20Bellosos/
 – World-Gazetteer.com

Populated places in Puerto Plata Province